The uvula (uvular lobe) forms a considerable portion of the inferior vermis; it is separated on either side from the tonsil by the sulcus vallecula, at the bottom of which it is connected to the tonsil by a ridge of gray matter, indented on its surface by shallow furrows, and hence called the furrowed band.

Additional Images

References

External links
 https://web.archive.org/web/20081224022115/http://isc.temple.edu/neuroanatomy/lab/atlas/omlr/
 https://web.archive.org/web/20010514005529/http://www.ib.amwaw.edu.pl/anatomy/atlas/image_11e.htm

Cerebellum